The Holographic Versatile Card (HVC) was a proposed data storage format by Optware; the projected date for a Japanese launch had been the first half of 2007, pending finalization of the specification, however as of March 2022, nothing has yet surfaced. One of its main advantages compared with discs was supposed to be the lack of moving parts when played. They claimed it would hold 30GB of data, have a write speed 3 times faster than Blu-ray, and be approximately the size of a credit card. Optware claimed that at release the media would cost about ¥100 (roughly $1.20) each, that reader devices would initially cost about ¥200,000(roughly $2400) while reader/writer devices would have cost ¥1 000,000 (roughly $12000, as per exchange rate of Apr 2011) each.

See also
 DVD
 HD DVD
 Holographic memory
 Holographic Versatile Disc
 Vaporware

References

External links
Optware Creator of HVC format.
Engadget News report on the Holographic Versatile Card
Über Gizmo News report on the Holographic Versatile Card
Image of HVC

Holographic data storage
Vaporware